Chen Qiang (born February 1956) is a former military officer in the Chinese People's Liberation Army. He attained the rank of major general in July 2010. He graduated from PLA National Defense University. He once served as Deputy Commander of 96351 Unit of the Second Artillery Corps. During the 2008 Sichuan earthquake, he joined in the relief work. In May 2014, he was sentenced to life imprisonment for "corruption, bribery, huge amount of property with unidentified sources".

References

1956 births
PLA National Defence University alumni
Living people
People's Liberation Army generals from Hubei
People's Liberation Army generals convicted of corruption